Aaron Shanley (born 9 February 1990) is a Northern Irish singer-songwriter and musician.

Career
Shanley began releasing demos on his imprint Love Gum Records to favourable reviews and radio support from BBC Radio Ulster, BBC Radio 1 and 6music in 2010. He performed at the Panarts Belfast Nashville Songwriters Festival where he was awarded the Katherine Brick Award for Songwriter of the Year at the Ulster Hall, held Artist in Residence at the Cathedral Quarter Arts Festival and received an honorary Access to Music award. He toured extensively in 2011 playing festivals including Liverpool Sound City and Glasgowbury and opening for a range of artists such as The Wedding Present, The Divine Comedy, Benjamin Francis Leftwich and Foy Vance.

Shanley moved to Nashville in 2012 to write for TV and film, among which his credits include the CW's Hart of Dixie and ABC's Switched at Birth. He continued to release demos through East Nashville-based American Cadence Records, before relocating to Phoenix, Arizona and rural Centennial, Wyoming where he released music under various pseudonyms and the mini LP Bedroom Tapes: Swiss Cottage Teal Roses. Shanley relocated again to London in 2014 where he wrote with other artists, including Norma Jean Martine, Gita Langley and Irwin Sparkes. He released the eight-track mini-LP Metal Alligator on Bandcamp in 2015, which he wrote and recorded alone over three days at his home in Barnes, London. Shanley toured infrequently between 2013 and 2016, but played a number of shows with Ciaran Lavery and occasional support slots for Hozier, Noah Gundersen, Oscar and the Wolf, Wakey!Wakey! and The Riptide Movement.

Metal Alligator was officially released in 2017 on Swallow Song Records with bonus material, live shows in Belfast and Derry with his band, The Horrortongues, and a solo performance at Mirrors in Hackney, London. The album was listed for the NI Music Prize 2017 and its lead single "My Mind Ain't Pretty (At the Minute)" was BBC Across the Line Track for the Day No. 475.

References

1990 births
Living people
Singer-songwriters from Northern Ireland
Irish male classical composers
People from Lisburn